Dirk Josef Hebel (born 24 November 1972) is a German former professional footballer who played as a midfielder. As a player, he played professionally in Germany, Turkey and England. He notably won the 1998–99 Third Division championship with Brentford. After retiring as a player, Hebel became an agent and a youth coach

Playing career

Germany and Turkey 
Hebel began his career at hometown club 1. FC Köln. He moved to Turkey to join 1. Lig club Bursaspor in January 1997. Hebel made 14 appearances and scored one goal during the 1996–97 season and helped the Green Crocodiles to a fifth-place finish in the league. One Turkish newspaper voted him the 1996–97 1. Lig Player Of The Season. Hebel left the club after the season.

Tranmere Rovers 
After interest from Grasshopper Club Zürich, Southampton and a failed trial at Norwich City, Hebel transferred to English First Division club Tranmere Rovers on 3 September 1997. He failed to make an appearance for the first team during the 1997–98 season, but was a regular for the reserves and departed the club in May 1998. Looking back in 2005 on his lack of appearances for Tranmere, Hebel said "I think it was a problem of the way I play football, which didn't compare to the way our coach Aldo wanted me to play. It is difficult to change a style you played for 20 years of your life".

Brentford 
Hebel signed for Third Division club Brentford on a free transfer on 25 August 1998. He made regular appearances until Boxing Day 1998 and made his final appearance for the club in a 3–1 victory over Brighton & Hove Albion before injury ended his season. Hebel made 19 appearances during the Bees' Third Division championship-winning 1998–99 season. A family situation saw Hebel turn down a new contract in 1999, in order to return to Germany.

Return to Germany 
Hebel signed for Oberliga Nordrhein club Bonner SC during the 1999 off-season. He made 19 appearances during the 1999–00 season and scored one goal. Hebel joined Oberliga Nordrhein club SCB Preußen Köln during the 2000 off-season. He made 26 appearances and scored five goals during the 2000–01 season, helping the club to a second-place finish behind Bayer Leverkusen II. Hebel wound down his career with spells at VfL Köln 99, FC Junkersdorf and SF Troisdorf, before retiring in 2005. During the 2003–04 season, he helped SF Troisdorf win promotion to the Verbandsliga Mittelrhein.

Post-retirement 
While a player for FC Junkersdorf, Hebel held the role of Director of Football. In 2002, Hebel became a FIFA-registered agent and set up the Fussballmarkt agency with friend Dominik Kaesberg and lawyer Nortbert Nasse. He has represented players such as Mario Götze, Sunday Oliseh, Goran Sablić and Patrick Weiser. In 2018, Hebel joined SC Fortuna Köln as an U14 coach.

Personal life 
Hebel is married to Nicole and has two sons named Darren (named after former Brentford teammate Darren Freeman) and Liam.

Career statistics

Honours 
Brentford
Football League Third Division: 1998–99

References

External links
Fussballmarkt official website

Dirk Hebel at verein.fortuna-koeln.de

1972 births
Living people
German footballers
Footballers from Cologne
Association football midfielders
Süper Lig players
English Football League players
Brentford F.C. players
1. FC Köln players
Bursaspor footballers
Bonner SC players
VfL Köln 99 players
German sports agents
FC Viktoria Köln players
1. FC Köln II players
Tranmere Rovers F.C. players
German expatriate footballers
German expatriate sportspeople in Turkey
Expatriate footballers in Turkey
German expatriate sportspeople in England
Expatriate footballers in England